Munising Falls is a waterfall located in Munising in the westernmost portion of the Pictured Rocks National Lakeshore in Alger County, Michigan. With the exception of the spring thaw, the amount of water falling is relatively small. There are trails leading to multiple viewpoints around the falls.

In the winter, the falls freeze forming an ice column. Munising Falls themselves are off-limits to climbers, but ice climbing is popular in the area and there are other spots in the vicinity where climbing is allowed.

The Munising Falls Visitor Center includes displays are the natural and cultural history of the Pictured Rocks National Lakeshore, including early iron smelting, geology, forest history, rare and endangered species, logging and recreation.  The Center is open seasonally.

References

External links

Pictured Rocks Waterfalls
 Munising Falls Visitor Center - National Park Service
1961 Life Magazine Photo

Protected areas of Alger County, Michigan
Waterfalls of Michigan
Pictured Rocks National Lakeshore
Landforms of Alger County, Michigan
Articles containing video clips